Art Napolitano (born January 7, 1956) is a retired American soccer player who played professionally in the North American Soccer League, American Soccer League and Major Indoor Soccer League.

Raised in Hamilton Township, Mercer County, New Jersey, Napolitano graduated in 1974 from Steinert High School, where he was part of two state champion soccer teams.

Napolitano attended Hartwick College where he played on the men's soccer team from 1974 to 1977.  His senior season, the Hawks won the NCAA Men's Division I Soccer Championship with Napolitano scoring one of the goals of the game.Steve long scored the winning goal.   He turned professional in 1978 with the Houston Hurricane of the North American Soccer League.  That fall, he moved to the Pittsburgh Spirit of the Major Indoor Soccer League.  He spent two seasons in Pittsburgh.  In the summer of 1980, he played for the Pennsylvania Stoners of the American Soccer League.  He then returned to the indoor game, this time with the Hartford Hellions before finishing his career with the Philadelphia Fever.

References

External links
NASL/MISL stats

1956 births
American soccer players
American Soccer League (1933–1983) players
Hartford Hellions players
Hartwick Hawks men's soccer players
Houston Hurricane players
Living people
Major Indoor Soccer League (1978–1992) players
North American Soccer League (1968–1984) players
Pennsylvania Stoners players
People from Hamilton Township, Mercer County, New Jersey
Philadelphia Fever (MISL) players
Pittsburgh Spirit players
Soccer players from New Jersey
Sportspeople from Mercer County, New Jersey
Steinert High School alumni
Association football forwards
Association football defenders